Lilja Mósesdóttir (born 11 November 1961) is a member of parliament of the Althing, the Icelandic parliament. She is a non-party member and is a member of the Icelandic delegation to the Parliamentary Assembly of the Council of Europe.

External links
Althing biography

Living people
1961 births
Lilja Mosesdottir
Place of birth missing (living people)
21st-century Icelandic women politicians